The BR Standard steam locomotives were an effort to standardize locomotives from the motley collection of older pre-grouping locos. Construction started in 1951. Due to the controversial British Railways' modernisation plan of 1955, where steam traction was abandoned in 
favour of diesel and electric traction, many of the locomotives' working lives were very short: between 7 and 17 years. Many have been preserved, mainly due to their having been sent to Barry Scrapyard.

ex-WD Austerity engines 

The first BR standards were the BR ex-WD Austerity 2-8-0 and BR ex-WD Austerity 2-10-0s.  They were given the numbers 90000-732 and 90750-774.  They were assigned the boiler types BR10 and BR11, and both had the tender type BR5.

Background 

Robert Riddles put his case for continuing to build steam locomotives in his presidential address to the Institution of Locomotive Engineers in November 1950. He compared capital costs to show that steam was cheaper than the alternatives, though he did not mention productivity differences, except to say fuel costs did not rank very high relative to total costs. For example, a Class 5 cost £16,000, compared to £78,100 for a 1,600 h. p. diesel, £138,700 for a gas turbine, or £37,400 for electric. He calculated the costs per drawbar horse power as £13 6s (steam), £65 (diesel), £69 7s (turbine) and £17 13s (electric). Riddles retired in 1953.

Design 
From 1951, BR started to build steam locomotives to its own standard designs, which were largely based on LMS practice but incorporating ideas and modifications from the other constituent companies, continental Europe and North America. Their design was overseen by Riddles.

Characteristic features were taper boilers, high running plates, two cylinders and streamlined cabs.

Construction 

Although more were ordered, 999 BR "Standards" were constructed: the last, 92220 Evening Star, was built in 1960. Most never achieved their potential service life and were withdrawn in working order.

Construction was split between the ex-LMS works at Crewe, Derby and Horwich, the ex-LNER works at Darlington and Doncaster, the ex-GWR works at Swindon, and the ex-SR works at Brighton.

Tenders 

The tenders used with the Standard locomotives were also new designs. There were different types due to the use of different coal-to-water ratios, weight restrictions and later improved designs.  It was standard practice for there to be fewer tenders than locomotives, as tenders took little time to overhaul compared to locomotives, locomotives entering works for overhaul would tend to lose their tenders to locomotives leaving works after overhaul.

Preservation 

A total of 46 standards have survived - of these, 38 were rescued from Woodham Brothers scrapyard in Wales.   The BR Standard Locomotive Owner's Group provides co-ordination.

New Builds 

The new build of the 'Clan' class 72010 “Hengist” is progressing steadily.
The new build of the Class 3 Tank 82045 is well underway, work continues as of 2021.

References

 BR standard classes